Kamrul Islam Rabbi (born 10 December 1991) is a Bangladeshi cricketer who has played for Barisal Division from the 2008–09 season. He is a right-handed batsman and a right-arm medium-fast bowler.

Domestic career
Rabbi made his first-class debut in October 2008 against Sylhet Division. He did not bat in the match, and bowled sixteen overs, taking figures of 3/33. He played for Barisal Burners in the Bangladesh Premier League.

His best first-class bowling figures are 5 for 65 for Barisal Division against Chittagong Division in 2012–13.

In October 2018, he was named in the squad for the Rajshahi Kings team, following the draft for the 2018–19 Bangladesh Premier League. He was the leading wicket-taker for Gazi Group Cricketers in the 2018–19 Dhaka Premier Division Cricket League tournament, with 17 dismissals in 11 matches. In November 2019, he was selected to play for the Rajshahi Royals in the 2019–20 Bangladesh Premier League.

On 8 December 2020, in the 2020–21 Bangabandhu T20 Cup, Rabbi took a hat-trick, bowling for Fortune Barishal against Minister Group Rajshahi.

International career
In November 2015, he was named in the One Day International squad for Bangladesh's series against Zimbabwe.

On 20 October 2016, he made his Test debut against England. In August 2018, he was one of twelve debutants to be selected for a 31-man preliminary squad for Bangladesh ahead of the 2018 Asia Cup. In November 2021, he was named in Bangladesh's Twenty20 International (T20I) squad for their series against Pakistan

References

External links

1991 births
Living people
Bangladeshi cricketers
Bangladesh Test cricketers
Bangladesh East Zone cricketers
Bangladesh South Zone cricketers
Barisal Division cricketers
Comilla Victorians cricketers
Cricket Coaching School cricketers
Victoria Sporting Club cricketers
Bangladesh under-23 cricketers
Rajshahi Royals cricketers
Gazi Group cricketers
People from Patuakhali district